Territorial spatial planning is the spatial planning system of the People's Republic of China which, according to its official definition, serves as the guide of the country's territory's development, the blueprint of sustainable development, as well as the fundamental basis of all kinds of development. Territorial spatial planning is an "all-in-one" planning encompassing former major function zone planning, land-use planning, urban and rural planning, as well as other different types of spatial planning.

Background 
Prior to the establishment of the Ministry of Natural Resources and the introduction of policies of territorial spatial planning, various types of spatial planning systems had existed in mainland China, which include (but are not limited to):

In addition to the variety and complexity, due to the overlaps and gaps among the functions of different plans and departments concerned and the failure to coordinate them, contradictions among different plans had frustrated the formulation and implementation of these plans. Despite the provisions in both the Urban and Rural Planning Law and the Land Management Law requiring their corresponding plans to be coordinated with others, the mechanism of coordination remained unclear and, in practice, unimplemented.

An attempt to solve this problem was conceptualized in the Decision of the CCCPC on Some Major Issues Concerning Comprehensively Deepening the Reform passed on November 12, 2013:

On December 12-13, the Central Working Conference of Urbanization discussed the necessity to "build a spatial planning system, push forward the reform of the planning system, and accelerate legislative works of planning".

The National New-type Urbanization Plan (2014-2020) put forward the idea to "strengthen coordination between urban planning and other planning systems including economic and social development planning, major function zone planning, land-use planning , ecological and environmental protection planning, and infrastructure planning. Push forward the integration of multiple plans, including economic and social development planning, urban planning, and land use planning, into one plan in areas where conditions permit." In the same year, the National Development and Reform Commission, the Ministry of Land and Resources, the Ministry of Environmental Protection, and the Ministry of Housing and Urban-Rural Development jointly issued the Notice on the Pilot Project of "Integrating Multiple Plans Into One" for Cities and Counties, and a total of 28 cities and counties were appointed in the pilot project.

On September 21, 2015, the Party's Central Committee and the State Council issued the Integrated Reform Plan for Promoting Ecological Progress, which declared that "A spatial planning system will be designed, with the main purpose of strengthening the spatial governance and improving its structure, which is nationally unified and better connected between different departments of government, and according to which management is divided between governments at multiple levels, in an effort to eliminate overlapping and conflicting spatial plans, the overlap and duplication of responsibilities between departments, and the issue of local authorities frequently changing their plans." "Spatial plans will be divided into national, provincial, and municipal (or county) levels (spatial plans for cities which are divided into districts will be formulated for the district level)."

On March 17, 2018, the First Session of the 13th National People's Congress adopted the Decision of the First Session of the 13th National People's Congress on the Plan for Institutional Reform of the State Council, and the Plan for Institutional Reform of the State Council was approved. The plan states: "The Ministry of Natural Resources will be established. The Ministry of Land and Resources's duties, the National Development and Reform Commission's duties to organize the formulation of major function zone plans, the Ministry of Housing and Urban-Rural Development's duties in regard to urban-rural planning management, the Ministry of Water Resources's duties in regard to water resources survey and ownership registration management, the Ministry of Agriculture's duties in regard to grassland resources survey and ownership registration management, the State Forestry Bureau's duties in regard to forest and wetland resources survey and ownership registration management, the State Oceanic Administration's duties, and the State Bureau of Surveying and Mapping's duties shall be integrated, and the Ministry of Natural Resources shall be established as a department under the State Council. The Ministry of Natural Resources shall retain the brand of the State Oceanic Administration. The Ministry of Land and Resources, the State Oceanic Administration and the National Administration of Surveying, State Bureau of Surveying and Mapping will be dismantled." On April 10, 2018, the Ministry of Natural Resources was officially inaugurated, which cleared the administrative barriers to the integration of different types of spatial planning.

On May 9, 2019, the Central Committee of the Communist Party of China (CPC) and the State Council issued the Opinions on Establishing and Supervising the Implementation of Territorial Spatial Planning System, which set out objectives of the reform of territorial spatial planning. On May 28 of the same year, the Ministry of Natural Resources issued the Notice by the Ministry of Natural Resources on the Comprehensive Development of Territorial Spatial Planning, which prescribed "Major function zone plans, general plans for land use, urban system plans, comprehensive plans for cities (towns), and marine function zoning, etc. shall no longer be newly formulated or submitted for approval. Provincial land-use plans, urban system plans, major function zone plans, comprehensive plans for cities (towns), and the former pilot provincial spatial plans and pilot cities and counties' "multiple plans to one" projects which have been approved and expire later than 2020 shall be integrated into newly formulated territorial spatial plans at the same level in accordance with new planning requirements."

On August 26, the Land Management Law of the People's Republic of China was amended and adopted. Article 18 was added to prescribe the legal status of territorial spatial planning:

Main points

"Five levels, three types, four systems" 
On May 27, 2019, the State Council Information Office held a press conference on the Guidelines of the CPC Central Committee and the State Council on Establishing and Supervising the Implementation of a Territorial Spatial Planning System. Zhuang Shaoqin, chief planner of the Ministry of Natural Resources, said in response to a journalist's question that the levels and contents of territorial spatial planning can be summarized into "five levels, three types, four systems". They are:

 The "five levels" are the five levels of the administrative divisions of China: national, provincial, municipal, county, and township levels. Among them, national plans are more strategic, provincial plans focus on coordination, and plans on municipal, county and township levels on implementation.
 The "three types" are general planning, detailed planning, and special planning.
 Comprehensive plans emphasize the comprehensiveness of planning. They are  overall arrangements for the protection, development, utilization and restoration of territorial spaces in a certain region, e.g. a whole administrative region.
 Detailed plans emphasize implementation. They are generally formulated on municipal, county levels or below and specify land plots' functions and development intensities, etc.. Detailed planns are the legal basis for the development and protection of territorial spaces,including the implementation of territorial land use regulation, the issuance of planning permission for urban and rural construction projects, and the implementation of different kinds of construction. Plans of villages outside urban development boundaries (UDB) are treated as detailed plans.
 Relevant special plans emphasize specialization. They are generally organized and formulated by natural resources departments or related departments, and can be formulated at the national, provincial, and municipal levels; In particular, special arrangements are made for specific regions' or river basins' spatial development, protection, and utilization to embody their specific functions.
 The "four systems" include planning's formulation and approval system, planning's implementation and supervision system which involve the procedures of planning; planning's law and policy system, and planning's technical standard system which support the operation of planning.

"Two evaluations" 
The "two evaluations" of territorial spatial planning, i.e. the evaluation of the carrying capacity of resources and environment and the evaluation of the suitability of territorial spatial development, are the basis for the formulation of territorial spatial planning. According to the Technical Guide for Evaluations of Resource and Environmental Carrying Capacity and Suitability of Territorial Spatial Development (Consultation Draft) formulated by the Ministry of Natural Resources, "resource and environmental carrying capacity" refers to "the comprehensive support level of natural resources, environmental capacity and ecological service function for human activities in a given territorial space", while the "suitability of territorial spatial development" refers to "the suitability of land space for different patterns of development, protection, and utilization, such as ecological protection, agricultural production, and urban construction."

"Three areas, three lines" 
Among "three areas, three lines", "three areas" refer to the areas of ecological, agricultural, and urban functions. "Three lines", i.e. three control lines, are the ecological conservation red line, permanent prime farmland, and the urban development boundary. The"three areas" highlight the division of dominant functions, while the "three lines" emphasize the strict control over boundaries.

The three control lines are defined as follows:

 Ecological conservation red line: Areas with special and important ecological functions within eco-spaces and must be strictly protected.
 Permanent prime farmland: Cultivated land under permanent special protection to ensure national food security and the supply of important agricultural produce.  They shall be designated on the basis of the current distribution of farmland, the quality of farmland, the cultivation of grain crops, and the situation of soil pollution; On the basis of strictly observing the farmland red line, a certain proportion of cultivated land that meets the quality requirements shall be designated according to law. In the designated permanent prime farmland, problems such as falsified designation, illegal occupancy and serious pollution should be comprehensively rectified to ensure that the area of permanent prime farmland is not reduced, the quality is improved and the distribution is stable。
 Urban development boundary: The boundary of areas in which intensive urban development and construction are allowed in order to meet the needs of urban development in a certain period of time, and in which urban functions is dominant. They include cities, administrative towns and various kinds of development zones.

The relationship between the "three areas" and "three lines" is listed as follow:

"Three areas" and "three lines" should be designated based on the result of "two evaluations".

Criteria for review 
According to the Notice by the Ministry of Natural Resources on the Comprehensive Development of Territorial Spatial Planning, the main criteria for the review of the provincial territorial and spatial plans include:

 Objectives for the development and protection of territorial spaces;
 Development intensities of territorial spaces, the scale of land for construction, the area covered by the ecological conservation red line, natural shoreline rate, cultivated land quantity and the protected area of permanent prime farmland, total water consumption, etc. and the distribution of the quotas to lower levels;
 The division of major function zones; the coordination and implementation of urban development boundaries, ecological protection red line, and permanent prime farmland;
 The spatial arrangement of urban systems; city clusters, metropolitan area and other spatial structures in key regions of regional coordination;
 The protection pattern of ecological buffer zones, ecological corridors and ecosystems; layouts of major infrastructure networks; requirements for supplies of urban and rural public service facilities;
 A system of natural reserves, and a system of historical and cultural protection that reflects local characteristics;
 Rural spatial sstructures and principles and requirements for promoting rural revitalization;
 Policies and measures to ensure the implementation of the plan;
 The guidance and obligatory requirements for plans at city and county levels, etc..

The criteria for municipal comprehensive territorial space plans which should be review by the State Council, in addition to a deeper and refined version of the provincial ones, also include:

 Municipal territorial space zoning regulations;
 Layouts of facilities including major transportation hubs, important linear utility networks, urban security and comprehensive disaster prevention system, underground spaces, and NIMBY facilities, as well as the principles and standards of the distribution of urban and rural public service facilities including policy-oriented urban housing, education, healthcare, elderly care, cultural and sports facilities;
 (Within the urban development boundary) The control area and the requirements of an even distribution of  structural urban green spaces, water bodies and other open spaces; The protection scope and requirements of all kinds of historical and cultural relics, the pattern and control requirements of ventilation corridors; Zoning of urban development intensities, control indexes including floor area ratios and densities, and spatial and morphological control requirements including heights and styles;
 Urban function layout and land use structure of the city center.

See also 

 Urban planning in China
 Spatial planning

References 

Urban planning in China
Spatial planning